This is a list of international football matches of the Germany national football team from 1908 until 1929.

Between their first match in 1908 and 1929, Germany played in 74 matches, resulting in 26 victories, 14 draws and 34 defeats. Germany made steady progress from early heavy defeats to England's amateur squad, managing to win two games in a row only in 1924.

Throughout this period they participated in two Olympic Football Tournaments in 1912 and in 1928, and on both occasions, Germany failed to go any further than the quarter-finals. On the latter occasion, they were eliminated by the eventual champions Uruguay in what was their first-ever game against a non-European team. Notable figures during these years was Gottfried Fuchs who become Germany's all-time top scorer with 13 goals after scoring 10 goals in a 16–0 win against Russia at the 1912 Olympic consolation tournament, becoming the top scorer of the tournament.

Results

1908

1909

1910

1911

1912

1913

1914

1920

1921

1922

1923

1924

1925

1926

1927

1928

1929

See also
Germany national football team results (1930–1942)
West Germany national football team results (1950–1990)
East Germany national football team results (1952–1990)
Germany national football team results (1990–1999)
Germany national football team results (2000–2019)
Germany national football team results (2020–present)

References

External links
Results at RSSSF 

1900s in Germany
1910s in Germany
1920s in Germany